Leucoptera coma is a moth in the family Lyonetiidae. It is found in Zaire and Uganda. It is considered a pest species on coffee.

The larvae feed on Coffea arabica and other Coffea species. They mine the leaves of their host plant.

External links

Leucoptera (moth)
Moths described in 1940
Moths of Africa